Martyringa hoenei is a moth in the family Lecithoceridae. It was described by Alexandr L. Lvovsky in 2010. It is found in Yunnan, China.

The wingspan is 19–24 mm. The forewings are brown with a small dark brown discal spot, another small dark spot in the middle of the cell and a small dark stroke under it. The hindwings are light grey.

Etymology
The species is named for Hermann Höne, the collector of the holotype and paratypes, a German consul in Shanghai and an entomologist.

References

Moths described in 2010
Martyringa
Moths of Asia